William H. Gay (born May 28, 1955) is a former American football defensive end. He resides in Detroit, Michigan. Gay played in the National Football League (NFL) for the Detroit Lions (1978–1987) and the Minnesota Vikings (1988).  He had 44.5 professional career quarterback sacks (60 unofficially). Gay was drafted in 1978 in the second round by the Denver Broncos.

High school career
In the early 1970s, Gay was known to many of his friends at San Diego's Hoover High School as "Musty" Gay. He played defensive end and tight end.

College career
Gay played college football at the University of Southern California. He transferred from San Diego City College. Gay was a member of 1976 Rose Bowl champion and 1975 Liberty Bowl champions. Gay was listed as the 1977 Consensus All American team.

Professional career

Detroit Lions
Gay started his career as a tight end. The 6-foot-5-inch, 250-pounder was a second-round choice of the Denver Broncos in the 1978 draft. The Lions obtained him on August 14 of that year, in exchange for defensive back Charlie West and a 1979 sixth-round pick.

He ended his Lions career as a defensive end with what was, at the time, the second-highest sack total in franchise history – 5.5 in a game.

Gay rated number 89 of the top 100 Detroit Lions.

During the 1979 and 1980 seasons, Gay teamed with Al "Bubba" Baker, Doug English, Dave Pureifory, and John Woodcock to form the core of the Lions’ "Silver Rush" defensive line. Their 1978 squad recorded a team record 55 sacks, and their 1981 unit had 47, first and fifth, respectively, on the Lions’ all-time list.

Minnesota Vikings

Gay finished his career with the Minnesota Vikings in 1988.

Television appearances
Gay appeared on many NFL Monday night games.

References

External links
 NFL.com player page

1955 births
Living people
American football defensive ends
USC Trojans football players
Detroit Lions players
Minnesota Vikings players
American Conference Pro Bowl players
Players of American football from San Francisco
San Diego City Knights football players
National Football League replacement players